Hinduism has a small following in Slovakia. As of 2021, there are about 975 (0.02%) Hindus in Slovakia. Hindu groups such as Hare Krishna, Yoga in Daily Life, Osho, Sahaja Yoga,  Chinmaya mission exists in Slovakia

Demographics

Official Recognition as a Religion
None of the above Hindu groups are registered in Slovak Republic. To register a new religion, a group must submit a list of 20,000 permanent residents who adhere to that religion. Registration of religious groups is not required in Slovakia; however, under existing law, only registered religious groups have the explicit right to conduct public worship services and other activities, although no specific religions or practices are banned or discouraged by the authorities in practice.

In 2017, the Slovakia government passed new religion law which mandates that religious groups seeking government recognition must provide, evidence of having 50,000 adult members, an increase from the previous 20,000-member requirement that had been in place since 2007. Hindus also express dismay at Slovakia's new religion law. Hindu statesman Rajan Zed, who is President of Universal Society of Hinduism, urged Slovak Republic President Andrej Kiska to disapprove it and asked for the immediate intervention of European Commission and Council of Europe Commissioner for Human Rights Nils Muižnieks to restore religious equality and freedom in Slovakia.

References

External links
 Churches Protest Against Introducing Yoga to Schools in Slovakia
 Chinmaya Mission
Yoga in Daily Life in Slovakia

Slovakia
Slovakia
Religion in Slovakia